The twenty-first series of Geordie Shore, a British television program based in Newcastle upon Tyne, began airing on 28 July 2020 and concluded following eight episodes on 15 September 2020. The series was due to begin earlier in the year, but due to the COVID-19 pandemic, production on the series was put on hiatus. Ahead of the series it was confirmed that three new cast members had joined the show, Ant Kennedy, Louis Shaw, and former The X Factor and Celebrity Big Brother contestant Amelia Lily. These replace former cast Sam Gowland and Tahlia Chung. During the series Nat Phillips and Beau Brennan made their final appearance.

Cast 
Chloe Ferry
Nathan Henry
Bethan Kershaw
Beau Brennan
Abbie Holborn
Chloe Ferry
 Anthony Kennedy 
James Tindale
Louis Shaw
Natalie Phillips
Amelia Lily

Duration of cast

 = Cast member is featured in this episode.
 = Cast member arrives in the house.
 = Cast member voluntarily leaves the house.
 = Cast member returns to the house.
 = Cast member leaves the series.
  = Cast member is not officially a cast member in this episode.

Episodes

Ratings

References

Geordie Shore
2020 British television seasons
Television productions suspended due to the COVID-19 pandemic